Hervé Inaudi (born 4 December 1952) is a French racing cyclist. He rode in the 1978 Tour de France.

References

1952 births
Living people
French male cyclists
Place of birth missing (living people)